Benoit Marion (born December 11, 1995) is a Canadian football defensive lineman for the Toronto Argonauts of the Canadian Football League (CFL).

Early life and education
Marion was born on December 11, 1995, in Montreal, Quebec. He attended André Grasset Cegep. Marion played U Sports football at Montreal from 2016 to 2019, appearing in 25 total games. In his college career he recorded 66.5 tackles, 19.5 tackles for loss, and 11 sacks, six of which came in his senior season. He also played junior ice hockey for the Quebec Remparts.

Professional career

Montreal Alouettes
Marion was selected in the 3rd round (25th overall) of the 2020 CFL Draft by the Montreal Alouettes. The 2020 CFL season was canceled and he was released before the  began on July 26, 2021.

Toronto Argonauts
Marion was signed by the Toronto Argonauts on October 25, 2021. He appeared in two games with the Argonauts, making one tackle and one pass deflection. In 2022, Marion played in 12 regular season games where he had five defensive tackles and three special teams tackles. He also scored his first career touchdown when he recovered a block kick and returned it 24 yards for a score against the Hamilton Tiger-Cats on August 6, 2022. Marion also played in the 109th Grey Cup victory over the Winnipeg Blue Bombers, which secured his first Grey Cup championship.

References

External links
 Toronto Argonauts bio

1995 births
Living people
Players of Canadian football from Quebec
Canadian football people from Montreal
Canadian football defensive linemen
Montreal Carabins football players
Quebec Remparts players
Montreal Alouettes players
Toronto Argonauts players